Still Life of a Lamb's Head and Flanks (Spanish: Bodegón con costillas, lomo y cabeza de cordero) or A Butcher's Counter (Spanish: Trozos de Carnero) is an 1808–1812 still life oil painting by Francisco Goya, which has been in the collection of the Louvre since 1909.

See also
List of works by Francisco Goya

References

External sources

Paintings by Francisco Goya
Paintings in the Louvre by Spanish artists
1800s paintings
1810s paintings
Still life paintings
Paintings about death